Harish Bhadani (11 June 1933 – 2 October 2009) was a Rajasthani poet. He was vice-president of Janvadi Lekhak Sangh. He was editor of Vatayan from 1960 to 1974.

References
 Harish_Bhadani
 Harish_Bhadani's Blog

External links
 Bollywood film songs with lyrics by Harish Bhadani

1933 births
2009 deaths
People from Bikaner
Indian male poets
Rajasthani-language writers
20th-century Indian poets
Poets from Rajasthan
20th-century Indian male writers